Muhammad Adib bin Zainudin (born 15 February 1995) is a Malaysian footballer who plays for Malaysia Super League club Terengganu. Adib plays mainly as a centre-back. Adib was promoted as the captain of the Malaysia U-23 national team in 2016 after the former captain Faris Shah Rosli got a long-term injury. He was part of the national team that qualified for the 2018 AFC U-23 Championship that will take place in China.

Born and raised in Mersing, Johor, Adib started his football career when he went to Sekolah Sukan Tunku Mahkota Ismail in Johor. In 2013, he played for Johor U-21 team before moved to Harimau Muda C on the following year.

In December 2014, Adib signed a contract with Shah Alam based club, UiTM FC. It was a good move as UiTM allowed him to pursue his degree in Sports science, although with a below-market salary offer. He spent two seasons with the club before he was loaned out to Felcra FC at the start of 2017 season. He wanted the loan move as the club offered him a better salary.

Adib made 6 appearances and 1 goal during 2017 Southeast Asian Games in Kuala Lumpur. The goal made during 4th match of the group stage against Laos which ended Malaysia won by 3–1.

Career statistics

Club

International goals
Malaysia U-23

Honours

International
Malaysia U-23
Southeast Asian Games
 Silver Medal: 2017

References

External links
Adib Zainudin at harimaumalaysia.my

1995 births
Living people
Malaysian people of Malay descent
Malaysian footballers
Malaysia international footballers
People from Johor
UiTM FC players
Felcra FC players
Association football fullbacks
Southeast Asian Games silver medalists for Malaysia
Southeast Asian Games medalists in football
Footballers at the 2018 Asian Games
Competitors at the 2017 Southeast Asian Games
Asian Games competitors for Malaysia